The 2016 Jiangxi International Women's Tennis Open was a professional tennis tournament played on hard courts. It was the third edition of the event, in the International category of the 2016 WTA Tour and took place in Nanchang, China, from August 1 – August 7, 2016.

Points and prize money

Point distribution

Prize money

Singles main draw entrants

Seeds

 Rankings are as of July 25, 2016.

Other entrants
The following players received wildcards into the singles main draw:
  Lu Jiajing
  Yang Zhaoxuan
  Zheng Wushuang 
  Zhang Yuxuan

The following player received entry by a protected ranking:
  Tereza Mrdeža

The following players received entry from the qualifying draw:
  Nicha Lertpitaksinchai
  Lu Jingjing 
  Junri Namigata
  Peangtarn Plipuech
  Storm Sanders
  Zhang Ying

The following player received entry by a lucky loser spot:
  Han Na-lae

Withdrawals 
Before the tournament
  Zarina Diyas → replaced by  Elitsa Kostova
  Magda Linette → replaced by  Han Na-lae
  Kateřina Siniaková → replaced by  Daniela Hantuchová
  Wang Qiang → replaced by  Marina Melnikova

Doubles main draw entrants

Seeds

 Rankings are as of July 25, 2016.

Other entrants
The following pairs received wildcards into the doubles main draw:
  Chang Kai-Chen /  Duan Yingying
  Sun Ziyue /  Zhu Aiwen

Champions

Singles

  Duan Yingying def.   Vania King 1-6, 6-4, 6-2

Doubles

  Liang Chen /  Lu Jingjing def.  Shuko Aoyama /  Makoto Ninomiya, 3–6, 7–6(7–2), [13–11]

References

2016
2016 WTA Tour
2016 in Chinese tennis
December 2016 sports events in China 
January 2016 sports events in China